Jaunzeme (masculine: Jaunzems or Jaunzemis) is a Latvian occupational surname, derived from the Latvian word for "new farmer" (from jauns – "new" and zeme – "land"). Individuals with the surname include:
Inese Jaunzeme (1932–2011), Latvian javelin thrower
Žaneta Jaunzeme-Grende (born 1964), Latvian politician and businesswoman

Occupational surnames
Latvian-language feminine surnames